Gerald Clyde "Gary" Johnson (born October 29, 1975) is a former professional baseball player who played one season for the Anaheim Angels of Major League Baseball.

References

1975 births
Living people
Anaheim Angels players
Major League Baseball outfielders
Baseball players from California
Boise Hawks players
Lake Elsinore Storm players
Erie SeaWolves players
Arkansas Travelers players
Salt Lake Stingers players